Youssouph Mamadou Badji (born 20 December 2001) is a Senegalese professional footballer who plays as a forward for Belgian First Division A club Charleroi, on loan from Club Brugge.

Club career
On 30 August 2021, he joined Brest in Ligue 1 for a season-long loan.

On 31 January 2022, Badji moved on a new 1.5-year loan to Charleroi, with an option to buy.

International career
Badji made his senior debut for Senegal in August 2019, playing in a 2020 African Nations Championship qualification match against Liberia.

Honours
Senegal
WAFU Nations Cup : 2019
Club Brugge
Belgian First Division A: 2020–21
Belgian Super Cup: 2021

References

External links

2001 births
People from Ziguinchor
Living people
Senegalese footballers
Senegal international footballers
Association football forwards
Casa Sports players
Club Brugge KV players
Stade Brestois 29 players
R. Charleroi S.C. players
Belgian Pro League players
Ligue 1 players
Championnat National 3 players
Senegalese expatriate footballers
Expatriate footballers in Belgium
Senegalese expatriate sportspeople in Belgium
Expatriate footballers in France
Senegalese expatriate sportspeople in France